Muren may refer to
 a number of rivers in Mongolia, Inner Mongolia, and Manchuria (cf. , Mörön - "river"), for example
 the Muling River, a left tributary of the Ussuri,
 Shar Mörön, one of the headwaters of the Xiliao He, which in turn is one of the headwaters of the Liao River,
 Delgermörön, one of the headwaters of the Selenge,
Mörön (city), a town on the Delgermörön,
Mörön Airport.
Muren, Indiana, an unincorporated community in the United States
People:
Zeki Müren, a Turkish singer, composer and actor,
Dennis Muren, an American film special effects artist,
Joseph C. Muren, a general authority of the Church of Jesus Christ of Latter-day Saints